The Simon Gallaher Show was an Australian television variety series which aired from 1982 to 1983 on the ABC. It starred singer and pianist Simon Gallaher and was produced by Ted Emery and Michael Shrimpton.

References

External links
The Simon Gallaher Show at IMDb

1982 Australian television series debuts
1983 Australian television series endings
English-language television shows
Australian variety television shows
Australian Broadcasting Corporation original programming